The 2011 Internationaux de Strasbourg was a professional tennis tournament played on clay courts. It was the 25th edition of the tournament which was part of the 2011 WTA Tour. It took place in Strasbourg, France between 16 and 22 May 2011.

WTA entrants

Seeds

 Rankings are as of May 9, 2011.

Other entrants
The following players received wildcards into the singles main draw:
  Alizé Cornet
  Ana Ivanovic
  Pauline Parmentier
  Nadia Petrova

The following players received entry from the qualifying draw:

  Stéphanie Foretz Gacon
  Anna-Lena Grönefeld
  Mirjana Lučić
  Ahsha Rolle

The following players received entry from a lucky loser spot:
  Christina McHale

Finals

Singles

 Andrea Petkovic defeated  Marion Bartoli, 6–4, 1–0 ret.
 It was Petkovic's 1st singles title of the year and the 2nd of her career.

Doubles

 Akgul Amanmuradova /  Chuang Chia-jung defeated  Natalie Grandin /  Vladimíra Uhlířová, 6–4, 5–7, [10–2]

External links
Official Website

2011 WTA Tour
2011
2011 in French tennis
May 2011 sports events in France